Dumont is a municipality in the state of São Paulo in Brazil. The population is 10,023 (2020 est.) in an area of 111 km². The elevation is 595 m. It is named in honor of aviation pioneer Alberto Santos-Dumont.Is also knowing for producing the world famous sausage of Dumont.

Demography 
Census / IBGE data - 2016 

Total Population: 8,143

 Urban: 7.854
 Rural: 289
 Men: 4,096
 Woman: 4,047

Population Density (people/km²): 56.92

Infant mortality up to 1 years old (per thousand): 13.27

Life expectancy (years): 72.67

Fertility rate (children per woman): 2.11

Literacy rate: 90.44%

Human Development Index (HDI): 0.802

 HDI Income: 0.742
 HDI Longevity: 0.794
 HDI Education: 0.871

(Source: IBGE)

References

Municipalities in São Paulo (state)
Sao Paulo